Equity Group Foundation (EGF) is an East African foundation based in Nairobi, Kenya. It was founded in 2008 to bolster Corporate social responsibility (CSR) for the Equity Group.

Overview
The main aim of Equity Group Foundation is to enhance the social and economic prosperity of people in the African region. This is through creating opportunities for people living at the bottom of the pyramid thus incorporating them into the modern economy. Since its inception in 2008, the Foundation has significantly enhanced the coordination of corporate social responsibility (CSR) interventions for Equity Group Holdings Limited. Through their Wings to Fly Program, Equity Group Foundation has been able to fund 28,009 students since inception. This program is co-funded by the Mastercard Foundation to the tune of US$100 million. The Harvard Business Review described the foundation as being focused on driving African development and creating opportunities for prosperity.

Focus areas
The Foundation has six areas of focus. These are:

Partners
Equity Group Foundation has developed partnerships with other funding and development organizations including the Mastercard Foundation, the UK Department for International Development (DFID), the United States Agency for International Development (USAID), KfW Development Bank, Financial Sector Deepening (FSD Kenya), Kenyatta University, Africa Nazarene University, World Bank Group, Norad, Equity Bank, Swiss Agency for Development and cooperation, European Union, Republic of Kenya, Kingdom of the Netherlands, IFAD(Investing in Rural people), IFC, Norfund, FAO, Australian AID, LUNDIN Foundation, AGRA, The Rockefeller Foundation, Mozilla Foundation, Agrocares, Marvel Five Investments Ltd

Equity Group Holdings Limited
Equity Group Holdings Limited is a large financial services conglomerate in East Africa whose stock is listed on the Nairobi and Uganda Securities Exchanges under the symbols EQTY and EBL respectively. The companies that comprise the Equity Group Holdings Limited include:
 Equity Bank Kenya Limited – Nairobi, Kenya 
 Equity Bank Rwanda Limited – Kigali, Rwanda 
 Equity Bank South Sudan Limited – Juba, South Sudan 
 Equity Bank Tanzania Limited – Dar es Salaam, Tanzania 
 Equity Bank Uganda Limited – Kampala, Uganda 
 Equity Banque Commerciale du Congo – Kinshasa, Democratic Republic of the Congo 
 Equity Consulting Group Limited – Nairobi, Kenya 
 Equity Insurance Agency Limited – Nairobi, Kenya 
 Equity Nominees Limited – Nairobi, Kenya 
 Equity Investment Services Limited – Nairobi, Kenya 
 Finserve Africa Limited – Nairobi, Kenya 
 Equity Group Foundation – Nairobi, Kenya 
 Equity Group Foundation International - New York, USA

References

2006 establishments in Kenya
Organizations established in 2006
Organisations based in Nairobi
Educational charities
Charities based in Kenya